Landzmierz  (German: Landsmierz, 1936-45: Neudeich) is a village in the administrative district of Gmina Cisek, within Kędzierzyn-Koźle County, Opole Voivodeship, in south-western Poland.

The village has a population of 650.

References

Landzmierz